Nikki SooHoo (Chinese: 司徒少英; born August 20, 1988) is a Chinese American actress.

Personal life and career
SooHoo attended Orange County High School of the Arts and completed a degree in world arts and cultures at University of California, Los Angeles. She is perhaps best known for playing gymnast Wei Wei in the 2006 teen comedy Stick It and playing Fiona Lanky in the Disney Channel show Phil of the Future. She also played Christina, one of the seven main cheerleaders in the fifth installment of the Bring It On series called Bring It On: Fight to the Finish. SooHoo went on to play Sue Ling in the TV series The War at Home.

She played a supporting role in the 2009 film The Lovely Bones as Denise "Holly" Le Ang.

In 2018, Soohoo played Betty Finn in the television adaptation of Heathers based on the film of the same name.

Filmography

References

External links

1988 births
American actresses of Chinese descent
American child actresses
American film actresses
American television actresses
Living people
Actresses from Los Angeles
21st-century American actresses
Orange County School of the Arts alumni
University of California, Los Angeles alumni